Chris Jastrzembski (born 9 September 1996) is a professional footballer who plays as a defender or midfielder for Faroese club Tvøroyrar Bóltfelag. Born in Germany, he represented Polish youth national teams.

Club career
In 2014, Jastrzembski signed for Polish second division side Bytovia Bytów after playing for the youth academy of Holstein Kiel in the German third division, where he suffered a ligament rupture and made 27 league appearances and scored 1 goal.

In 2017, he signed for German fifth division club TSV Schilksee after playing for VfB Auerbach in the German fourth division.

In 2018, Jastrzembski signed for German sixth division team TuS Collegia Jübek.

Before the 2021 season, he signed for B68 in the Faroe Islands after playing for German fifth division outfit Husumer SV.

Upon leaving UMF Selfoss and Iceland he described it as the "worst country I have ever been to" citing experiences of poor treatment and racism towards him.

After unsuccessfully trialing at Śląsk Wrocław and receiving offers from clubs such as Club Green Streets of the Maledives, FC Ulaanbaatar of Mongolia, Sheikh Russel KC of Bangladesh, as well as unnamed clubs from Bosnia, Norway, Northern Macedonia, Austria, Cyprus, Sri Lanka, Thailand, Cambodia, and Botswana; he eventually chose Prey Veng in C-League 2.

On 6 March 2023, it was announced Jastrzemski returned to the Faroe Islands to join Tvøroyrar Bóltfelag.

Personal life
His brother, Dennis, is also a footballer. In Iceland, he also worked as a physiotherapist and groundskeeper alongside his playing duties.

References

External links
 
 

Living people
1996 births
Footballers from Schleswig-Holstein
People from Rendsburg
Polish people of German descent
German people of Polish descent
Polish footballers
German footballers
Association football defenders
Association football midfielders
Poland youth international footballers
I liga players
Regionalliga players
Faroe Islands Premier League players
1. deild karla players
Bytovia Bytów players
VfB Auerbach players
B68 Toftir players
Selfoss men's football players
Prey Veng FC players
Tvøroyrar Bóltfelag players
Polish expatriate footballers
German expatriate footballers
German expatriate sportspeople in Poland
Polish expatriate sportspeople in the Faroe Islands
Polish expatriate sportspeople in Iceland
Expatriate footballers in Poland
Expatriate footballers in the Faroe Islands
Expatriate footballers in Iceland
Expatriate footballers in Cambodia